In particle physics, a truly neutral particle is a subatomic particle that is its own antiparticle. In other words, it remains itself under the charge conjugation, which replaces particles with their corresponding antiparticles. All charges of a truly neutral particle must be equal to zero. This requires particles to not only be electrically neutral, but also requires that all of their other charges (such as the colour charge) be neutral.

Examples
Known examples of such elementary particles include photons, Z bosons, and Higgs bosons, along with the hypothetical neutralinos, sterile neutrinos, and gravitons. For a spin-½ particle such as the neutralino, being truly neutral implies being a Majorana fermion.

Composite particles can also be truly neutral. A system composed of a particle forming a bound state with its antiparticle, such as the neutral pion, is truly neutral. Such a state is called an "onium", another example of which is positronium, the bound state of an electron and a positron.

(The example presumes on evidence to date, which gives no indication that neutrinos are Majorana particles.)

References

 

 

Particle physics